Panaorus is a genus of dirt-colored seed bugs in the family Rhyparochromidae. There are at least four described species in Panaorus, found in the Palearctic.

Species
These four species belong to the genus Panaorus:
 Panaorus adspersus
 Panaorus albomaculatus
 Panaorus csikii
 Panaorus japonicus (Stål, 1874)

References

External links

 

Rhyparochromidae
Taxa described in 1951